Galen is an unincorporated community in Deer Lodge County, Montana, United States. It is located near Montana State Prison and in the community is installed the Reintegrating Youthful Offenders Correctional Facility.

References

Unincorporated communities in Deer Lodge County, Montana
Unincorporated communities in Montana